The A23 is a motorway (freeway) in Portugal.  It connects Guarda, at the A25 motorway (near the Spanish border), to Torres Novas at the A1, the main motorway of Portugal.

Construction on A23 was completed in 2003. The road has tolls.

References

Motorways in Portugal